Alexander Mathews Davis (January 17, 1833 – September 25, 1889) was a nineteenth-century politician and lawyer from Virginia.  Davis served for two years in the Virginia Senate and briefly in the U.S. House of Representatives, before his opponent successfully contested the election result.

Early and family life
Born in Old Mount Airy, Virginia, Davis attended the old field schools and was privately tutored as a child. He later attended and graduated from Emory and Henry College, then read law.

He married Mary Jane Dickenson Davis (1848 - 1896), daughter of Col. John Dickenson of Grayson County (and for whom Dickenson County was named upon its creation in 1880). They would have at least three sons: Albert Conley Davis (1869 - 1893), Joseph C Davis (1871 - 1888) and James Garnett Davis (1873 - 1931).

Career
Admitted to the bar in 1854, Davis began his private legal practice in Wytheville, Virginia, and later moved to Independence, Virginia.

At the outbreak of the Civil War, Davis served in the Confederate Army as captain of Company C of the 45th Regiment, Virginia Infantry in 1861. He earned a promotion to major in 1862 and another to lieutenant colonel in 1864. Captured near the end of the war, he was held prisoner on Johnson's Island in Lake Erie.

After his release, Davis was elected to the Virginia Senate, and served from 1869 to 1871, when he was succeeded by fellow Confederate veteran Abner W. C. Nowlin. The following year Davis ran as a Democrat for the United States House of Representatives. He was elected to the U.S. House of Representatives with 50.55% of the vote, defeating Republican Christopher Yancy Thomas. However, Thomas successfully contested the result and was seated in March 1874. Afterward, Davis resumed practicing law in Independence, Virginia

Death and legacy
Davis died on September 25, 1889, and was interred in the Davis Family Cemetery. Some of his family's papers are held in the special collections at the College of William and Mary.

References

External links

 Retrieved on 2008-09-27

1833 births
1889 deaths
Democratic Party Virginia state senators
Virginia lawyers
Emory and Henry College alumni
Confederate States Army officers
American Civil War prisoners of war
People of Virginia in the American Civil War
19th-century American politicians
People from Wytheville, Virginia
Democratic Party members of the United States House of Representatives from Virginia
People from Grayson County, Virginia
19th-century American lawyers